Haji Yusuf bin Abdul Wahab (Jawi: حج يوسف بن عبدالوهاب; is a Malaysian politician. He servers in the government as Chairman of Construction Industry Development Board (CIDB).

Election results

References 

1963 births
Living people
People from Sarawak
Malaysian Muslims
Members of the Dewan Rakyat
21st-century Malaysian politicians